Harold White may refer to:

 Harold White (English cricketer) (1876–1965), English cricketer
 Harold White (New Zealand cricketer) (1896–1977), New Zealand cricketer
 Harold White (American football) (c. 1913–1916), American football player
 Harold White (politician) (1883–1971), Australian politician
 Harold Albert White (1896–1970), British-born Canadian World War I flying ace
 Harold G. White (born 1965), American mechanical and aerospace engineer
 Sir Harold Leslie White (1905–1992), Parliamentary Librarian of Australia
 Harold O. White (1886–?), American college football player and coach
 Harold R. White (1872–1943), Irish composer and music critic
 Harold Temple White (1881–1972), New Zealand music teacher, conductor, organist and composer

See also 
 Harry White (disambiguation)